Hurricane Fausto was a Pacific hurricane that caused light damage to Baja California Sur in September 1996. On September 10, a tropical depression developed a short distance south-southeast of the Mexican Riviera. Slowly intensifying, Fuasto paralleled the coastline. It became a hurricane on September 12, and after briefly reaching major hurricane intensity, increasing wind shear resulted in a weakening trend. It moved ashore Baja California Sur on September 13 as minimal hurricane, and struck the mainland the next day. On September 15, the tropical cyclone degenerated into a remnant circulation. Fausto's remnants continued moving eastward across the Gulf of Mexico and later emerged into the Atlantic, before developing into a large nor'easter on September 17. Afterward, the system moved northeastward, before it was last noted on September 18.

In Mexico, while  of rain was recorded, only one person was killed and damage was light.

Meteorological history 

The origins of Fausto can be traced back to an area of disturbed weather that was located over Venezuela on August 31. This area of disturbed weather was the southern part of a tropical wave which became Hurricane Fran in the Atlantic Ocean.

Upon becoming a tropical cyclone, the depression was initially forecast to remain over water. Guided by a weak ridge near Baja California, the depression moved northwestward at about 20 km/h (10 mph) and paralleled the coast of Mexico for the next three days. Meanwhile, the tropical cyclone developed well-defined banding features. Based on this, the system was upgraded into Tropical Storm Fausto later that day. While banding featured increased and the tropical cyclone became more organized and a well-established upper-level outflow, the National Hurricane Center (NHC) re-assessed the intensity at 70 mph (195 km/h).

Fausto ultimately developed an eye; as such, the tropical storm was upgraded into a hurricane on September 11. Hurricane Fuasto reached its peak intensity at 120 mph (195 km/h) midday on the 12th, and turned northward while centered south of the southern tip of Baja California. The hurricane made landfall near Todos los Santos on Baja California on September 13 with winds of 140 km/h (85 mph), and turned north-northeastward, it made landfall on the mainland of Mexico near Los Mochis several hours later as a weaker hurricane. Fausto rapidly weakened, and the storm's low-level circulation center dissipated at 0000 UTC on September 15, over the Sierra Madre mountains. However, Fausto's mid-level circulation remained intact. For the next couple of days, Fausto's remnants continued moving eastward, moving across Mexico and then moving across the Gulf of Mexico, before later emerging into the Atlantic. On September 17, Fausto's remnants developed into a large nor'easter, just off the coast of the Delmarva Peninsula. Afterward, the system moved northeastward, passing to the east of Cape Cod, Massachusetts on September 18, before it was last noted later that day.

Preparations and impact 

The southern part of Baja California went under a hurricane watch and a tropical storm warning on September 12. The next day, a hurricane warning was issued for the same areas. That night a hurricane watch was issued for the mainland of Mexico. On the September 14, all the warnings were dropped. Fourteen ports throughout Mexico were closed due to the storm. An estimated 5,000 residents evacuated to 110 shelters set up by officials. Following the substantial loss of life due to Hurricane Ismael in 1995, port officials urged, and sometimes pressured, to return to port. Many flights were canceled.

Waves of up to  walloped Pacific beaches along the southern tip of Baja California Sur and yachts were damaged. There was no major damage on the mainland. Similar amounts of rain may have spread inland over mainland Mexico. The storm total of 18.50 inches/470 mm reported at San Vicente de la Sierra. Despite the rainfall, damage in Mexico was minor, with only one casualty (a San Diego vacationer) caused by a downed power line in a trailer park. Damage totaled to around $800,000 (1996 USD) in both Baja California and the mainland in Mexico. However, Fausto downed power poles, smashed windows, and disrupted the tourist business at Cabo San Lucas and La Paz.

See also 
 Other storms of the same name
 List of Category 3 Pacific hurricanes

References

External links 
 Hurricane Fausto Tropical Cyclone Report

1996 Pacific hurricane season
Pacific hurricanes in Mexico
Category 3 Pacific hurricanes